Cora Venus Lunny (born 1982) is an Irish violinist, composer, singer, and actress. She is the daughter of Irish musician Dónal Lunny and German photographer Julia Buthe.

Established as a classical musician since her teens, Lunny is active as a soloist, chamber musician, interpreter  of  contemporary  classical  music, improvising  violinist  and  composer. She has toured Europe, America and China as a violin soloist with the Dublin Philharmonic Orchestra.

Early years
Born into a musical family in Dublin, Lunny was given her first violin at the age of three, immediately showing a natural aptitude and love for the instrument. She was classically trained in the Suzuki Method. A brief fling with movie acting failed to distract her, and a life in music became her goal. From the age of thirteen she studied intensively with violin teachers around Europe, including Rimma Sushanskaya, Joji Hattori, Alexander Arenkov, Arkady Futer, Lara Lev and Vladimir Spivakov.

At the age of sixteen, she became the youngest ever winner of the RTÉ Musician of the Future competition, and was chosen by The Irish Times''' TV ad campaign to represent the new face of Ireland.

Music career
In 2001, she was a laureate of the Sarasate Violin International Competition in Pamplona, Spain, to which she would return again in 2007 as a member of the international jury.

In 2002, Lunny was a guest musician on Sinéad O'Connor's album of traditional Irish songs, Sean-Nós Nua, her first excursion into the non-classical world. This inspired her to improvise more and experiment with other genres of music. A few months in Vienna among the classical establishment became an unintentional sabbatical, and confirmed that despite her love for classical music, she needed to broaden her musical horizons. A jam with Nigel Kennedy in Dingle in 2002 (filmed for a Philip King documentary) resulted in an invitation to Berlin with his band, to play some Polish folk music and some Jimi Hendrix tunes. Subsequently, she accompanied Kennedy on a tour of Taiwan, Japan and New Zealand as second soloist, playing Vivaldi Double Concertos and some pieces by Bartok.

Lunny's musical travels took her as far as Iceland and the Faeroe Islands and, in 2004, she made her first foray into film score composition for Sangrail, an unfinished short. In 2005, she made her debut as a violist in a performance of Mozart's Sinfonia Concertante with Vladimir Spivakov and the Ulster Orchestra at the Waterfront Hall, Belfast. Also in 2005, she joined Clodagh Simonds' Fovea Hex.

Lunny has featured as a guest performer on other artists' albums (see Selected discography section). In 2011, Lunny released her first album, 1943, followed by Terminus (Conscientiae) in 2014.

Film career
Lunny has appeared in several Irish films: Rawhead Rex (1986), Man About Dog (2004), Speed Dating (2007), Bachelors Walk Christmas Special (2006), and Mr Crocodile in the Cupboard (2008). She also contributed as a musician on the soundtrack of the following films and documentaries: Screw Cupid (2008), Truth About Kerry (2010), Men of Arlington (2011), and Mud Pies & Kites: Death & Resurrection in Haiti (2012).

Selected discography

Solo albums
 1943 (2011) 
 Terminus (Conscientiae) (2014)

With Sinéad O'Connor
 Sean-Nós Nua (2002)

With Fovea Hex
 Neither Speak Nor Remain Silent (2005-2007)
 Part 1: Bloom (2005)
 Part 2: Huge (2006)
 Part 3: Allure (2007)
 Hail Hope! (2010)
 Here Is Where We Used To Sing (2011)
 The Salt Garden 1 (2016)

With Damien Rice
 9 (2006)
 My Favourite Faded Fantasy (2014)

 With Eivør
 Mannabarn (2007)

 With Luka Bloom
 Eleven Songs (2008)

 With Declan de Barra
 A Fire To Scare The Sun (2008)

 With The Jimmy Cake
 Spectre & Crown (2008)

 With Dublin Gospel Choir
 Doing Their Thing (2009)

 With Yurodny
 Evenset (2009)

 With Tiger Cooke
 Fingertips Of The Silversmith (2010)

With Laura Sheeran 
 Lust Of Pig & The Fresh Blood (2011)
 Echo'' (2013)

References

External links

 
 

 

1981 births
20th-century Irish people
21st-century Irish people
Living people
Irish women violinists
Irish classical violinists
Musicians from County Dublin
21st-century classical violinists
Women classical violinists